The Kingdom of Imereti was a Georgian monarchy established in 1455 by a member of the house of Bagrationi when the Kingdom of Georgia was dissolved into rival kingdoms. Before that time, Imereti was considered a separate kingdom within the Kingdom of Georgia, of which a cadet branch of the Bagrationi royal family held the crown.

The realm was conquered by George V the Brilliant and once again united with the east Kingdom of Georgia. From 1455 onward, however, Imereti became a constant battleground between Georgian and Ottoman forces for several centuries, resulting in the kingdom's progressive decline due to this ongoing instability. Under pressure from Pavel Tsitsianov, in 1804 Solomon II of Imereti accepted Russian Imperial suzerainty, only to be deposed entirely in 1810. During the time that Imereti was a vassal state, the Mingrelia, Abkhazia and Guria princedoms declared their independence from Imereti and established their own governments.

Kings of Imereti

First House of Imereti
David I (1258–1293)
Constantine I (1293–1326)
Michael (1326–1329)
Bagrat I (1329–1330)
Vacant (1330–1387)
Alexandre I (1387–1389)
George I (1389–1392)
Vacant (1392–1396)
Constantine II (1396–1401)
Demetrius I (1401–1455), only recognized as Duke by Alexander I of Georgia

Second House of Imereti

Demetrius II (1446–1452)
Bagrat II (1463–1478)
Alexander II (1478–1510)
Bagrat III (1510–1565)
George II (1565–1585)
Leon (1585–1588)
Rostom (1588–1589, 1590–1605)
Bagrat IV (1589–1590)
George III (1605–1639)
Alexander III (1639–1660)
Bagrat V (1660–1661, 1663–1668, 1669–1678, 1679–1681)
Vakhtang Tchutchunashvili (1661–1663)
Archil (1661–63, 1678–79, 1690–91, 1695–96, 1698)
Demetre (1663–1664)
George IV (1681–1683)
Alexander IV (1683–1690, 1691–1695)
Simon (1699–1701)
George V (1696–1698)
Mamia (1701–02, 1711, 1713)
George VI (1702–1707)
George VII (1707–11, 1712–13, 1713–16, 1719–1720)
George VIII (1716)
Alexander V (1720–1741, 1741–1746, 1749–1752)
George IX (1741)
Mamuka (1746–1749)
Solomon I (1752–1766, 1768–1784)
Teimuraz (1766–1768)
David II (1784–1789, 1790–1791)
Solomon II (1789–1790, 1792–1810)

Heads of House of Imereti after 1815 
Since Solomon II of Imereti had no sons, he proclaimed Prince Constantine, son of king David II of Imereti, and his male-line senior descendants as heirs to the throne of the Kingdom of Imereti. 

Hereditary Prince Constantine (I) (1815–1844), son of king David II
Constantine (II) (1844–1885), son of Prince Constantine (I)
Mikheil (1885–1888), son of Prince Constantine (II) 
George (I) (1888–1932), son of Prince Mikheil
George (II) (1932–1972), son of Prince George (I), had no issue
Constantine (III) (1972-1978), young brother of George (II)
Princess Thamar (would have been Head of House from 1978), daughter of Prince Mikheil Imeretinsky (1900-1975), younger brother of Constantine (III)

After the death of Hereditary Prince Constantine (III) (1898–1978), because the male-offspring of this branch came to end, the headship of the House of Bagrationi-Imereti transmitted to Prince Irakli Bagrationi (1925–2013), son of Prince Grigol, the male-line descendant of Prince Bagrat, younger brother of King Solomon I of Imereti (1752–1784).

Irakli Bagrationi (1925–2013)
David Bagrationi (born 1948) (2013–2017), transmitted his headship to his son
Irakli Bagrationi (born 1982) (from 2017)

References

 
Imereti, Kingdom of
States and territories established in 1455
1810 disestablishments
Imereti
Former monarchies of Asia
Former Russian protectorates
States and territories disestablished in 1810
Vassal states of the Ottoman Empire